Alfreton Town Football Club is an English semi-professional association football club based in Alfreton, Derbyshire. As of the 2013–14 season they compete in the Conference Premier, the fifth tier of English football. The present club was formed in 1959 through the merger of Alfreton Miners Welfare and Alfreton United, though a previous incarnation of the team played for two seasons in the Midland Football League and entered the FA Cup five times between 1924 and 1929.

After the clubs re-formation they spent two seasons in Division One North of the Central Alliance before being readmitted to the Midland League. In 21 seasons Alfreton won the title three times and finished as runners-up on a further three occasions. The league merged with the Yorkshire Football League to form the Northern Counties East Football League in 1982 and it was after five seasons that Alfreton won their first ever promotion, having finished as champions in 1986–87. 
 
In 1996 the side won promotion to the Northern Premier League Premier Division but struggled, lasting only two seasons before suffering back-to-back relegations. After three seasons back in the Northern Counties East League they achieved consecutive promotions, returning to the Northern Premier League Premier Division where they finished fourth, then the club's highest ever league finish. Founding members of the Conference North in 2004, several years of consolidation were followed by consecutive third place finishes and then the league title in 2010–11. Promotion to the Conference Premier saw the team competing in a national league competition for the first time.

Alfreton first entered the FA Cup in the 1924–25 season and have progressed to the second round proper on two occasions, in 2008–09 and 2012–13. They played in the inaugural edition of the FA Trophy and have appeared in every competition since, barring three seasons in the FA Vase after dropping to Step 5 of the National League System. Since the club's re-formation Alfreton have also taken part in the every staging of the Derbyshire Senior Cup, winning eight times and finishing as runners-up on a further eight occasions.

Key

Seasons

Notes

References 

Seasons
 
Alfreton Town